John Bunting may refer to:

John Bunting (American football) (born 1950), former head football coach at the University of North Carolina at Chapel Hill and former NFL player
John Bunting (public servant) (1918–1995), senior Australian public servant and Australian High Commissioner to the UK
John Bunting (MP) (c. 1480–1544/46), British Member of Parliament for New Romney, Kent
John Bunting (sculptor) (1927–2002), British sculptor and teacher
John Bunting (loyalist) (born c. 1967), Northern Irish loyalist leader
John Bunting (born 1966), Australian serial killer and ringleader of the Snowtown murders
Jack Bunting (John Baden Bunting, 1900–1951), English football goalkeeper